Peter Lawrence Oppenheim Leaver KC (born 28 November 1944) was Chief Executive of the Premier League from 1997 to 1999.

He was educated at Aldenham School and Trinity College Dublin. He was a  deputy High Court judge from 1994 to 2017 and was Chairman of the London Court of International Arbitration from 2008 to 2012.

He is the father of the businessman Marcus Leaver.

References

1944 births
Living people
People educated at Aldenham School
Alumni of Trinity College Dublin
Members of Lincoln's Inn
Irish chief executives
20th-century King's Counsel